New Dover may refer to:

New Dover, New Jersey
New Dover, Ohio